Irina Berezina (also known as Irina Feldman and Irina Berezina-Feldman; born 7 July 1965) is an Australian chess International Master and trainer, and five-time Oceania women's chess champion. She was born in Kyiv, Ukraine.

Chess career
Berezina tied for first place in the Women's Zonal 12 Championship in Jakarta in 1993, and as a result was awarded the FIDE title of Woman International Master (WIM).

In 1995 she won the Asian-Pacific Women's Zonal Championship in the Genting Highlands, Malaysia and went on to play in the 1995 Women's Interzonal Championship in Kishinev, Moldova, where she scored 5.5 points from 13 games.

Berezina won the Australian Women's Championship in 1999. In the same year, she achieved the title of International Master (IM) by coming equal second in the inaugural Oceania Zonal Championship held on the Gold Coast, Australia. She won the Oceania Women's Zonal Championship five times: in 2002, 2005, 2007, 2011, and 2013.

She competed in the Women's World Chess Championship three times: in 2006, 2012, and 2015.

Berezina played on board one of the Australian national team at seven Women's Chess Olympiads, in 1994, 1996, 2000, 2002, 2004, 2006 and 2014.

Trainer 
She has a degree in Chess Coaching from Kiev Institute of Physical Culture and Sport, and is a co-owner of "Chess Masters", a chess coaching business in Sydney, with her husband, IM Vladimir Feldman.

In 2005 Berezina was accredited as a FIDE Trainer by FIDE.

References

External links

Irina Berezina chess games at 365Chess.com

Chess Masters

1965 births
Living people
Chess International Masters
Chess Woman International Masters
Chess Olympiad competitors
Australian female chess players
Russian emigrants to Australia
Russian female chess players
Chess coaches
Sportspeople from Kyiv